Adam James Connolly (born 10 April 1986) is an English footballer who plays for  club Gloucester City. He played in the Football League for Cheltenham Town.

Career

A product of the Cheltenham Town Youth System, Connolly made his way through the ranks at Whaddon Road, signing as a professional in the summer of 2004. He made his debut on 1 April 2005 in a 2–1 defeat to Boston United and appeared a handful of times for the Robins in his first season, gradually making more appearances over the next two years. In 2007–2008, he appeared fifteen times in League One, mainly as a substitute.

After ending the 2007–2008 season, he was released by Cheltenham. He spent time on trial at Newport County, but instead signed for Hednesford Town after impressing in their friendly with Rangers while on trial. However, he failed to settle at the side and left after making just two appearances, signing for Bath City.

In July 2014, he signed for Gloucester City.

Career statistics

Honours
Bath City
 Conference South play-off winner: 2009–10

References

External links

1986 births
Living people
English footballers
Cheltenham Town F.C. players
Hednesford Town F.C. players
Bath City F.C. players
English Football League players
National League (English football) players
Gloucester City A.F.C. players
Association football midfielders